Chris Evert Lloyd successfully defended her title, by defeating Claudia Kohde-Kilsch 6–2, 6–4 in the final.

Seeds
The first eight seeds received a bye into the second round.

Draw

Finals

Top half

Section 1

Section 2

Bottom half

Section 3

Section 4

References

External links
 Official results archive (ITF)
 Official results archive (WTA)

1985 Virginia Slims World Championship Series